Retusidae is a family of very small sea snails, barrel-bubble snails, marine opisthobranch gastropod mollusks. These are headshield slugs, in the superfamily Bulloidea.

Genera
Genera within the family Retusidae include:
 Pyrunculus Pilsbry, 1895
 Relichna Rudman, 1971
 Retusa T. Brown, 1827
 Sulcoretusa J.Q. Burch, 1945
Genera brought into synonymy
 Coleophysis: synonym of Retusa T. Brown, 1827
 Cylichnina Monterosato, 1884: synonym of Retusa T. Brown, 1827
 Mamilloretusa F. Nordsieck, 1972 accepted as Retusa T. Brown, 1827
 Sao H. Adams & A. Adams, 1854 accepted as Pyrunculus Pilsbry, 1895
 Sulcularia Dall, 1921 accepted as Sulcoretusa J.Q. Burch, 1945
 Utriculus T. Brown, 1844 accepted as Retusa T. Brown, 1827

References

 Powell A. W. B., New Zealand Mollusca, William Collins Publishers Ltd, Auckland, New Zealand 1979

External links
 Miocene Gastropods and Biostratigraphy of the Kern River Area, California; United States Geological Survey Professional Paper 642 
  Serge GOFAS, Ángel A. LUQUE, Joan Daniel OLIVER,José TEMPLADO & Alberto SERRA (2021) - The Mollusca of Galicia Bank (NE Atlantic Ocean); European Journal of Taxonomy 785: 1–114